Tumor necrosis factor receptor superfamily, member 4 (TNFRSF4), also known as CD134 and OX40 receptor, is a member of the TNFR-superfamily of receptors which is not constitutively expressed on resting naïve T cells, unlike CD28. OX40 is a secondary co-stimulatory immune checkpoint molecule, expressed after 24 to 72 hours following activation; its ligand, OX40L, is also not expressed on resting antigen presenting cells, but is following their activation. Expression of OX40 is dependent on full activation of the T cell; without CD28, expression of OX40 is delayed and of fourfold lower levels.

Function 
OX40 has no effect on the proliferative abilities of CD4+ cells for the first three days, however after this time proliferation begins to slow and cells die at a greater rate, due to an inability to maintain a high level of PKB activity and expression of Bcl-2, Bcl-XL and survivin. OX40L binds to OX40 receptors on T-cells, preventing them from dying and subsequently increasing cytokine production. OX40 has a critical role in the maintenance of an immune response beyond the first few days and onwards to a memory response due to its ability to enhance survival. OX40 also plays a crucial role in both Th1 and Th2 mediated reactions in vivo.

OX40 binds TRAF2, 3 and 5 as well as PI3K by an unknown mechanism. TRAF2 is required for survival via NF-κB and memory cell generation whereas TRAF5 seems to have a more negative or modulatory role, as knockouts have higher levels of cytokines and are more susceptible to Th2-mediated inflammation. TRAF3 may play a critical role in OX40-mediated signal transduction. CTLA-4 is down-regulated following OX40 engagement in vivo and the OX40-specific TRAF3 DN defect was partially overcome by CTLA-4 blockade in vivo.  TRAF3 may be linked to OX40-mediated memory T cell expansion and survival, and point to the down-regulation of CTLA-4 as a possible control element to enhance early T cell expansion through OX40 signaling.

Clinical significance 
OX40 has been implicated in the pathologic cytokine storm associated with certain viral infections, including the H5N1 bird flu.

As a drug or drug target
An artificially created biologic fusion protein, OX40-immunoglobulin (OX40-Ig), prevents OX40 from reaching the T-cell receptors, thus reducing the T-cell response.  Experiments in mice have demonstrated that OX40-Ig can reduce the symptoms associated with the cytokine storm (an immune overreaction) while allowing the immune system to fight off the virus successfully.

An anti-OX40 antibody GSK3174998 has started clinical trials as a cancer treatment.  Research in mice has included the combination of an agonistic OX40 antibody (clone OX86) injected directly into a tumor in combination with an unmethylated CpG oligonucleotide, which as a TLR9 ligand activates expression of OX40 so that it can be affected.

Interactions 
CD134 has been shown to interact with TRAF5 and TRAF2.

References

External links

Further reading 

 
 
 
 
 
 

T cells
Clusters of differentiation